Charlie Flowers (June 28, 1937 – December 7, 2014) was an American football player. He played for the Ole Miss Rebels of the University of Mississippi, and was elected to the College Football Hall of Fame in 1997. In December 1959, he was signed by the National Football League's New York Giants. However, in order to retain his eligibility to play in the Sugar Bowl, he requested to keep the contract a secret until January 2, 1960. Wellington Mara accepted this request and the team did not submit the contract to Pete Rozelle for approval. Later in December, the American Football League's Los Angeles/San Diego Chargers offered him more money to play for them. He accepted their offer and withdrew from his contract with the Giants. The Giants attempted to enforce the contract, but their plea was rejected due to their unclean hands. He later played for the New York Titans.  Flowers died on December 7, 2014, at the age of 77 following a long illness.

References

1937 births
2014 deaths
All-American college football players
Ole Miss Rebels football players
College Football Hall of Fame inductees
Los Angeles Chargers players
San Diego Chargers players
New York Titans (AFL) players
People from Marianna, Arkansas
Players of American football from Arkansas
American Football League players